Athrips autumnella is a moth of the family Gelechiidae. It is found in Uzbekistan, Turkmenistan, Tadzhikistan and China (Inner Mongolia, Ningxia).

The wingspan is 12–16.5 mm. The forewings are dark grey in the costal and light grey in the posterior area, these two areas divided by a black longitudinal stripe. The hindwings are light grey. Adults are on wing from September to November.

The larvae feed on Calligonum juncteum, Calligonum leucocladum and Calligonum microcarpum. They feed on young shoots of their host plant from within a silken tube made between stalks. The larvae reach a length of 15 mm. They are green with a blue hue or light brown and they have a black or brown head.

References

Moths described in 2003
Athrips
Moths of Asia